Derjuginella is a genus of sea snails, marine gastropod mollusks in the family Pyramidellidae, the pyrams and their allies.

Species
There is only one known species to exist within this genus of gastropods, the only species within the genus Derjuginella is:
 Derjuginella rufofasciata (E.A. Smith, 1875)

References

External links
 To World Register of Marine Species

Pyramidellidae
Monotypic gastropod genera